Ose was a 1970s French progressive-electronic band formed by Hervé Picart, alongside Richard Pinhas, of the band Heldon, and François Auger.

Career 
The group was formed in 1978 by Hervé Picart, alongside the break up of Pinhas' band Heldon. Picart was primarily known as a music journalist, rather than a musician himself. The extent of the group's work was one album, named Adonia.

Personnel 
 Hervé Picart – electric & slide guitars, electric organ, synthesizer, bass, composer, & producer
 Richard Pinhas – guitar, synths & sequencer, electronics arrangements
 François Auger – drums

Discography 
 Adonia – 1978

References 

French electronic rock musical groups
French progressive rock groups
Musical groups established in 1978
Musical groups disestablished in 1978
1978 establishments in France
1978 disestablishments in France
Musical trios